is a Japanese pink film, adult video (AV) actress and gravure model. In 2003, she was called one of Japan's highest-earning AV performers and "probably its most famous." Many of her movies emphasized her large bust and thin body.

Life and career
Maria Yumeno was born in Tokyo, Japan on August 17, 1978, according to her standard profiles but an interview published in 2003 declares that the "24-year-old from Tokyo is in fact a 30-year-old from Yamaguchi." Yumeno comes from a broken family, as her father left when she was a child. After leaving school, she worked for a time as a graphic designer.

AV debut
As with many other AV actresses, Yumeno was found by a scout in Tokyo's Shibuya district where the penniless Yumeno accepted an offer of a "modelling audition" to make money. She made her debut in adult videos in late 1998 with the h.m.p. release The Wild Bust. Soon afterwards she appeared in a nude pictorial set for the Japanese men's magazine Bejean.

Yumeno made several more videos in 1999 with h.m.p. and at the 1999 Tokyo Sports Film Awards, she was given the Best AV Actress Award. She went on to work with a number of other major AV studios of that period including Crystal-Eizou, CineMagic, V&R Planning, Kuki, Atlas21 and Alice Japan including making the S&M themed Masochistic Room Service for Kuki in March 2000. 
She also starred in some early S&M and bondage works for Attackers.

Yumeno appeared in the erotic science fiction film I.K.U., released in Japan in May, 2001, in the role of Reiko number 2. The movie had previously premiered at the Sundance Film Festival in January 2000. In October 2002, Yumeno starred in the pink film  directed and written by Daisuke Yamanouchi and released by Xces Film.

For a long time, there has been a connection between AV and the Japaneses wrestling community and on November 4, 2002, Yumeno made her pro wrestling debut participating in a Women's Erotic Wrestling (WEW) match in Yokohama. In April and May 2003, she also took part in live action hardcore erotic wrestling matches for Adult Video Wrestling (AVW) with the losers having sex with the referees and others. Also participating were AV actors Taka Kato and Chocoball Mukai (a former professional wrestler). A six-hour video,  AVW Fuck Down!, was released in June 2003.

Retirement and comeback
Yumeno's interview published in September 2003 states that she had retired from the adult video industry a few months earlier. However, she continued acting in mainstream films including the October 2003 horror film  where she played a zombie maid. 
Yumeno also had a role in the manga-based live action film version of  released in October 2004. In a voice role, Yumeno played the lead character, Rina, in the adult anime OVA  which came out in Japan in October 2004. Dark Tours was released in the United States in August 2006 with English subtitles and/or dubbing.

In 2005, Yumeno appeared with fellow AV actresses Hitomi Hayasaka, Naho Ozawa and Ran Monbu as well as AV actor Chocoball Mukai in the erotic comedy film , which had its debut at the Yubari International Fantastic Film Festival in February 2005 and was later shown theatrically in Tokyo in August 2005. The film, starring gravure idol Miku Matsumoto, was subsequently released on DVD.

Yumeno was back performing in adult videos in December 2005 with Super Bust Female Doctor for "mature woman" specialist studio Madonna, followed by further mature videos, Voluptuous Mature Nakadashi for Glory Quest in 2006 and Bewitching Lady for Maxing Stargate in 2007. It can be noted that in Yumeno's profile from 2004, her bust measurement is listed as 93 cm (37 in.) but as of 2008 according to her official website, her bust was 115 cm (45 in.).

Yumeno had a role in the June 2008 theatrical drama  directed by Hideyuki Katsuki. The film, fifth in the "Dekotora no shu" series, starred Show Aikawa and also featured pink film actress Junko Miyashita and former AV actress Honoka. 

Partial filmography

Magazine appearances
 Bejean
 April 1999 (5p., nude)
 Weekly Playboy
 June 6, 2000 (5p., nude)
 August 22–29, 2000 (1p., nude)
 December 26–31, 2000
 April 3, 2001 (7p., nude)

Notes

Bibliography

External links 
 
 

Japanese film actresses
Pink film actors
Japanese pornographic film actresses
Japanese female adult models
Japanese gravure idols
1978 births
Living people
Actresses from Tokyo